Idalou Independent School District is a public school district based in Idalou, Texas (United States) that serves students in northeastern Lubbock County.

In addition to Idalou, the district includes a small section of Lubbock.

Idalou ISD has three schools, all of which share a single campus –

Idalou High School (Grades 9-12), 
Idalou Middle (Grades 5-8), and 
Idalou Elementary (Grades PK-4).

In 2009, the school district was rated "academically acceptable" by the Texas Education Agency.

Notable alumni
Cline Paden
Gerald S. Paden
Josh Abbott

References

External links
Idalou ISD Official site.
LubbockSchools.com - Idalou ISD

School districts in Lubbock County, Texas
School districts in Lubbock, Texas